The Nationalist Movement is a Mississippi-founded white nationalist organization with headquarters in Georgia that advocates what it calls a "pro-majority" position. It has been called white supremacist by the Associated Press and Anti-Defamation League, among others. Richard Barrett was succeeded by unanimous vote as leader by Thomas Reiter after Barrett's murder. Its Secretary originally was Barry Hackney, and the position of Secretary was discontinued by Thomas Reiter.  Thomas Reiter saved most Nationalist Movement assets and intellectual property after Barrett's murder. The symbol of the movement is the Crosstar. In 2012 with the endorsement of Thomas Reiter, Travis Golie was sworn in as the Leader of The Nationalist Movement. Like Reiter, Golie was an original Barrett-era Nationalist Movement member. Golie returned The Nationalist Movement headquarters to the South where it originated.

Lawsuits

In 1987 the movement applied for 501(c)(3) non-profit status. This status was denied due to the organization's use of resources for non-charitable purposes. The movement filed a lawsuit challenging the decision on constitutional grounds, but was defeated. The movement was active in protests against Martin Luther King Jr. Day in Atlanta, Georgia in 1989. Its Neighborhood, Home, Family and Country parade and rally in South Boston drew crowds and police. It held a demonstration in Simi Valley, California in 1992, in defense of the police officers accused of beating Rodney King. In 1993, it held a "Majority-Rights Freedom Rally" at the Colorado State Capitol, in opposition to gay rights.

In 1992, it won in the United States Supreme Court, in Forsyth County, Georgia v. The Nationalist Movement, establishing new First Amendment jurisprudence, which lifted bans on its use of public property and mandated police protection for its parades and rallies.  It was sued in 1993 by the Texas Human Rights Commission, alleging that it violated the federal housing bill, but it won the case and had prohibitions against free speech stricken from federal housing regulations.  It is financed by donations of members and occasional court-awarded damages from opponents.  It sees itself as policing the ranks of nationalists, often supporting the prosecution of white supremacists, such as Matthew Hale and David Duke.

Crosstar
Crosstar, the website of the Nationalist Movement, was launched on June 13, 1996.  Richard Barrett served as administrator from its founding until his death in 2010 at which time Thomas Reiter was unanimously elected as First Officer and Administrator of Crosstar. On November 11, 2011, the site relaunched in a modern, social network format. The site ceased operation in 2016.

All The Way

All The Way was the official organ of the Nationalist Movement from 1987 to 1996, published monthly at Learned, Mississippi.  Correspondents included Travis Golie, Barry Hackney and Gerald McManus.

It was founded in June 1987. Richard Barrett served as editor from its founding until his death in 2010.  In 1996, the publication migrated to the Internet, appearing in both print and online versions.

The newspaper maintained editorial policies in favor of what it termed "majority-rule democracy." It reported current events from a white supremacist standpoint, including appeals from Marines and others to get out of Iraq and Afghanistan.  All The Way showcased white supremacists, notably Edgar Ray Killen, and billed itself as "the longest-running continually published nationalist newspaper."

See also
 List of white nationalist organizations

References

External links
 Supremacist Rally Gets Green-Light CBS News
 Anti-Nationalist Prostesters Arrested Global Report article
 Protest The Nationalist Movement March MIT editorial
 Stage Set for Racist Resurgence Yes, Weekly critique
 The Real Trent Lott Salon article
 What's White is Right John Sugg critique
 VFW post refuses 'white supremacy' group Princeton, New Jersey "Packet" October 19, 2000.

Politics and race in the United States
White supremacist groups in the United States